Anamaría Font is a Venezuelan theoretical physicist, with most of her work focusing on string theory.

Early life and education 
She was born in Anaco, Venezuela. She obtained her Bachelor degree in physics, Cum Laude in 1980 from Simon Bolivar University, in Caracas, Venezuela. Her research has been focused on models about the primordial components of matter in the context of string theory.

Academic career 
Font received a PhD from the University of Texas at Austin in 1987, under the supervision of Austin Gleeson. Her PhD thesis was Four-Dimensional Supergravity Theories Arising from Superstrings. While pursuing her PhD,  she received classes from Nobel Prize physicist Steven Weinberg. After completing her PhD she moved to France to work as a postdoctoral fellow in the Annecy-le-Vieux Particle Physics Laboratory (LAPP). Since 1989, she has been a physics professor at the Universidad Central de Venezuela in Caracas, Venezuela. She was also a visiting professor at the Arnold Sommerfeld Center for theoretical physics in Munich, Germany.

In 1998, she was awarded, jointly with Fernando Quevedo, the ICTP Prize in the field of High Energy Physics(in honour of Chen Ning Yang).

Her article titled Strong-weak coupling duality and non-perturbative effects in string theory had a big influence in the second revolution of string theory in 1995. It was in this article where the term S-duality was used.

In 1991, Font was awarded the Lorenzo Mendoza Fleury Science Prize. Given by the country's national private industry, the prize recognizes the work of Venezuelan scientists, and is the most important scientific prize in Venezuela.

In 2013, Font was elected a fellow of The World Academy of Sciences (TWAS) for the advancement of science in developing countries.

Other achievements

Font has been actively involved in projects related to education in physics and mathematics in Venezuela and other countries. In July 2018, Physics Today magazine published an interview with Font about the status of science in Venezuela. The publication data base INSPIRE-HEP included three of her notorious publications into their data base.

She is a member of the Organization for Women in Science for the Developing World (OWSD).

Selected publications 
Font has more than 50 publications with over 6000 citations. Below is a list of some of her publications.

References 

Living people
Theoretical physicists
Venezuelan women physicists
University of Texas at Austin alumni
20th-century women physicists
21st-century women physicists
People from Anzoátegui
21st-century physicists
20th-century physicists
TWAS fellows
Academic staff of the Central University of Venezuela
Venezuelan expatriates in the United States
1959 births
Venezuelan women educators
21st-century Venezuelan women scientists
21st-century Venezuelan scientists